Radio Konjic is a Bosnian local public radio station, broadcasting from Konjic, Bosnia and Herzegovina.

It was launched on 4 April 1992 by Radio-televizija d.o.o. Konjic . This radio station broadcasts a variety of programs such as music, talk shows and local news. Program is mainly produced in Bosnian language. Estimated number of potential listeners of Radio Konjic is around 31.412

The radio station is also available in municipalities Jablanica, Prozor and Hadžići. Program is available via IPTV platform Moja TV (Channel 244) for listeners in BiH and in diaspora.

Frequencies
The program is currently broadcast at 2 frequencies in Herzegovina-Neretva Canton.

 Konjic 
 Konjic

See also 
List of radio stations in Bosnia and Herzegovina

References

External links 
 www.fmscan.org
 www.konjic.ba
 www.radiostanica.ba
 Communications Regulatory Agency of Bosnia and Herzegovina

Konjic
Radio stations established in 1992